The 57th Air Division is an inactive United States Air Force unit. Its last assignment was with the Fifteenth Air Force, based at Minot Air Force Base, North Dakota. It was inactivated on 24 June 1991.

History
"Established as the 8th Pursuit Wing, it conducted training from 1940 to 1941. As a paper unit, it moved to India and then to Egypt in December 1942."

It finally gained personnel and aircraft, and became operational as the 57 Bombardment Wing in March 1944. "Initially, the 57th flew close air support missions against enemy troops and gun emplacements in the vicinity of Anzio, Italy; later, it flew bombing missions against railway marshalling yards at Foligno, Littoria, and Terni, Italy. Between 19 March 1944 and 11 May 1944 the 57th took part in Operation Strangle to destroy Italian marshalling yards, railroad repair facilities and other rail targets such as bridges, tunnels, and viaducts. It continued to fly close air support and interdiction missions in Italy throughout the war, and supported the invasion of southern France on 15 August 1944." The unit was inactivated at the end of the war.

Reactivated as an intermediate command echelon of Strategic Air Command in 1951, the 57th Air Division assumed a supervisory role of subordinate bombardment units. "Its units trained to conduct long range bombardment, air refueling, and strategic reconnaissance operations around the world. Between 1965 and 1969, division units supported Operation Arc Light bombing and Operation Young Tiger air refueling operations in Southeast Asia. In 1980 the 57th reorganized to employ Strategic Air Command conventional strategic forces (bomber, tanker, and reconnaissance) in crisis situations worldwide."

It was inactivated in June 1991 due to budget constraints and the reduction of forces after the end of the Cold War.

Lineage
 Established as the 8th Pursuit Wing on 19 October 1940
 Activated on 6 November 1940
 Inactivated on 1 November 1941
 Redesignated 8th Fighter Wing on 6 July 1942
 Activated on 24 July 1942
 Redesignated 57th Bombardment Wing on 6 April 1943
 Inactivated on 12 September 1945
 Redesignated 57th Air Division on 10 April 1951
 Organized on 16 April 1951
 Discontinued on 16 June 1952
 Inactivated on 16 June 1952
 Activated on 16 June 1952
 Inactivated on 2 July 1969
 Activated on 22 January 1975
 Inactivated on 14 June 1991

Assignments

 General Headquarters Air Force, 6 November 1940
 Southeast Air District (later Third Air Force), 16 January 1941
 Interceptor Command (of Third Air Force), 21 April 1941
 III Interceptor Command, c. 1 July – 1 November 1941
 IX Fighter Command, 24 July 1942
 Attached to III Fighter Command, 26 July – c. 28 October 1942
 Ninth Air Force, 22 December 1942
 Attached to IX Fighter Command, 22 December 1942 unknown 1943
 Twelfth Air Force, c. 23 August 1943

 XII Air Support Command, 31 August 1943
 XII Bomber Command, 1 January 1944
 Twelfth Air Force, 1 March 1944
 Army Air Forces Service Command, Mediterranean Theater of Operations, 15 August – 12 September 1945
 Fifteenth Air Force, 16 April 1951 16 June 1952
 Fifteenth Air Force, 16 June 1952
 Eighth Air Force, 4 September 1956 2 July 1969
 Fifteenth Air Force, 22 January 1975 14 June 1991

Components

Wings
 Bombardment Wings
 5th Bombardment Wing: 22 January 1975 – 14 June 1991
 17th Bombardment Wing: 1 July 1965 – 2 July 1968
 19th Bombardment Wing: 25 July 1968 – 2 July 1969
 28th Bombardment Wing: 1 May 1982 – 23 January 1987
 68th Bombardment Wing: 1 July 1964 – 1 July 1965; attached 10 August – 1 September 1966, assigned 2 September 1966 – 2 July 1969.
 92d Bombardment Wing: 16 April 1951 – 16 June 1952. 16 June 1952 – 4 September 1956 (detached 14 October 1954 – 12 January 1955 and 26 April – 6 July 1956); 23 January 1987 – 15 June 1988
 98th Bombardment Wing: 16 April 1951 – 16 June 1952 (detached 16 April 1951 – 16 June 1952). 16 June 1952 – 25 November 1953 (detached entire period)
 99th Bombardment Wing (see 99th Strategic Reconnaissance Wing)
 111th Bombardment Wing (later 111 Strategic Reconnaissance Wing): 21 April 1951 – 1 January 1953
 319th Bombardment Wing: 22 January 1975 – 1 May 1982;
 416th Bombardment Wing: 2 July – 2 September 1966 (detached 10 August – 2 September 1966)
 465th Bombardment Wing: attached 10 August – 1 September 1966, assigned 2 September 1966 – 25 July 1968
 499th Air Refueling Wing: 1 January 1963 – 25 June 1966

 Strategic Missile Wings
 44th Strategic Missile Wing: 1 May 1982 – 23 January 1987
 91st Strategic Missile Wing: 22 January 1975 – 14 June 1991
 321st Strategic Missile Wing: 22 January 1975 – 1 May 1982; 23 January 1987 – 16 June 1988

 Air Refueling Wings
 301st Air Refueling Wing: 15 November 1965 – 2 July 1966
 4050th Air Refueling Wing: 4 September 1956 – 1 January 1963

 Reconnaissance Wings
 55th Strategic Reconnaissance Wing: 1 April 1980 – 1 October 1982
 99th Strategic Reconnaissance Wing (later 99th Bombardment Wing): 1 January 1953 – 2 July 1969 (detached 29 January – 25 April 1956; c. 1 October 1967-c. 1 April 1968 and c. 23 September 1968-c. 1 April 1969)
 111th Strategic Reconnaissance Wing (see 111th Bombardment Wing)

Groups
 12th Bombardment Group: 1 November 1943 – 1 January 1944 (detached 1 November 1943 – 1 January 1944)
 47th Bombardment Group: 6 October – 10 December 1943 (detached entire period)
 49th Pursuit Group: 24 May – 2 October 1941 (detached 6 August – 2 October 1941)
 57th Fighter Group: 1 November 1943 – 1 January 1944 (detached entire period)
 79th Fighter Group: 1 November 1943 – 1 January 1944 (detached entire period)
 310th Bombardment Group: 15 March 1944 – 12 September 1945 (detached 20 August – 12 September 1945)
 319th Bombardment Group: 10 November 1944 – 10 January 1945
 321st Bombardment Group: 1 November 1943 – 1 January 1944 (detached 4 November 1943 – 1 January 1944) 1 March 1944 – 12 September 1945 (detached 20 August – 12 September 1945)
 340th Bombardment Group: 1 November 1943 – 1 January 1944 (detached 1 November 1943 – 1 January 1944); 1 March 1944 – 26 July 1945

Stations

 Maxwell Field, Alabama, 6 November 1940
 Army Air Base, West Palm Beach (later Morrison Field), Florida, 16 May – 1 November 1941
 Drew Field, Florida, 24 July – 29 October 1942
 Bombay Airport, India, 29 November 1942
 Deolali, India, 3 December 1942
 Port Tewfik (Suez), Egypt, 22 December 1942
 Landing Ground 91 (near Cairo), Egypt, 23 December 1942
 RAF Kabrit, Egypt, 12 February 1943
 RAF Deversoir, Egypt, 5 June 1943
 Tunis, Tunisia, 28 August 1943
 Lentini, Sicily, 4 September 1943

 Capodichino Airport, Italy, 7 October 1943
 Foggia Airfield, Italy, 29 October 1943
 Pollena Trocchia, Italy, 4 January 1944
 Ghisonaccia Airfield, Corsica, 20 April 1944
 Migliacharo, Corsica, c. 5 October 1944
 Fano Airfield, Italy, 7 April 1945
 Pomigliano Airfield, Italy, 23 August – 12 September 1945
 Fairchild Air Force Base, Washington, 16 April 1951
 Westover Air Force Base, Massachusetts, 4 September 1956 – 2 July 1969
 Minot Air Force Base, North Dakota, 22 January 1975 – 14 June 1991

Campaigns
Campaign Streamers: World War II: Naples Foggia (Air); Rome Arno

Aircraft and missiles

 Seversky P-35, 1941;
 Curtiss P-40 Warhawk, 1941.
 North American B-25 Mitchell, 1941–1945;
 Martin B-26 Marauder, 1944.
 Douglas B-26 Invader, 1951;
 Boeing B-29 Superfortress, 1951–1952;
 Boeing RB-29 Superfortress, 1951–1952;
 Convair B-36 Peacemaker, 1951–1954, 1954–1956;
 Convair RB-36 Peacemaker], 1952–1956;
 Convair GRB-36 Peacemaker, 1955–1956;
 Republic RF-84F Thunderflash, 1955–1956;

 Boeing B-52 Stratofortress, 1956–1969, 1975–1991;
 Boeing KC-97 Stratofreighter, 1956–1965;
 Boeing KC-135 Stratotanker, 1957–1969, 1975–1991;
 Boeing EC-135 Looking Glass, 1964–1969.
 Minuteman III, 1975–1991;
 Boeing C-135 Stratolifter, 1980–1982;
 Boeing E-4, 1980–1982;
EC-135 Looking Glass, 1980–1982;
Boeing RC-135 Cobra Ball, 1980–1982;
LGM-30F Minuteman II, 1982–1987.

See also
 List of United States Air Force air divisions

References

Notes
 Explanatory notes

 Citations

Bibliography

 
 

Units and formations of Strategic Air Command
057